Fennia is a biannual peer-reviewed open access scientific journal published by the Geographical Society of Finland. It covers all aspects of geography. The journal was established in 1889. The editor-in-chief is Kirsi Pauliina Kallio (University of Tampere). The journal is abstracted and indexed in Scopus (Citescore 2016, 0.67). and the Emerging Sources Citation Index.

See also
Danish Journal of Geography
Geografiska Annaler
Norwegian Journal of Geography

References

External links 
 

Geography journals
Publications established in 1889
Biannual journals
English-language journals
Academic journals published by learned and professional societies